Canalibotys is a genus of moths of the family Crambidae. It contains only one species, Canalibotys linealis, which is found in Namibia.

References

Odontiinae
Crambidae genera